Phoebe Louise Adams Gloeckner (born December 22, 1960), is an American cartoonist, illustrator, painter, and novelist.

Early life 
Gloeckner was born in Philadelphia, Pennsylvania. Her mother was a librarian and her father, David Gloeckner, was a commercial illustrator. Her father's family was Quaker and she attended Quaker schools when she was young. She has a younger sister.

Gloeckner's parents divorced when she was 4 years old. In 1972, when she was 11 or 12 years old, her mother remarried and the family moved to San Francisco. She attended several Bay Area schools, including The Urban School of San Francisco and Lick-Wilmerding High School. She was a boarding student at Castilleja (in Palo Alto) for a year, but returned to San Francisco to live with her mother, her mother's boyfriend, and her sister, when she was 14.

Gloeckner began cartooning at the age of 12. Because her mother was dating Robert Armstrong, a cartoonist in Robert Crumb's band Cheap Suit Serenaders, she met many San Francisco underground comics figures who had a profound influence upon her, including Robert Crumb, Aline Kominsky, Bill Griffith, Terry Zwigoff, and Diane Noomin.

Gloeckner attended San Francisco State University from 1980 to 1985, where she was a pre-med student and studied French and art. She spent the 1983–1984 academic year in Université d’Aix-Marseille studying art, French, and biology, and from 1984 to 1985 spent about six months studying Czech and literature at Charles University in Prague. She has an M.A. in Biomedical Communications from University of Texas Southwestern Medical Center at Dallas, which she received in 1988. The degree was in medical illustration. Her 1987 dissertation was on the "Semiotic Analysis of Medical Illustration," in which she studies narrative devices used in medical and surgical illustration.

Gloeckner became interested in medical illustration through her maternal grandfather, an antique dealer who collected and sold old books, and her paternal grandmother, Dr. Louise Carpenter Gloeckner, who was a physician in Philadelphia and was the first woman to be elected vice president of the American Medical Association.

Career 
Gloeckner worked prolifically as a medical illustrator since 1988, and her training is evident in her paintings and comics art, which are highly detailed and often prominently feature the human body. Her first prominent work in fiction publishing, a series of illustrations for the RE/Search edition of J. G. Ballard's novel The Atrocity Exhibition, used clinical images of internal anatomy, sex, and physical trauma in ambiguous and evocative combinations.

Her early comics work, in the form of short stories published in a variety of underground anthologies including Wimmen's Comix, Weirdo, Young Lust, and Twisted Sisters, and in the tabloid zine, RE/Search (numbered volumes), was sporadic and rarely seen until the 1998 release of the collection A Child's Life and Other Stories. This was followed by her 2002 graphic novel The Diary of a Teenage Girl: An Account in Words and Pictures, which revisited the troubled life of the young character (usually referred to as "Minnie Goetze") previously featured in some of her comics, this time in an unusual combination of prose, illustration, and short comics scenes.

Her novel and many of her short stories are semi-autobiographical, a frequent cause of comment due to their depiction of sex, drug use, and childhood traumas; however, Gloeckner has stated that she regards them as fiction. Sexual content led to A Child's Life and Other Stories being banned from the public library in Stockton, California, after it was checked out by an 11-year-old reader. The mayor of Stockton called the book "a how-to book for pedophiles." The graphic novel was also classified as pornography and refused entry by customs officials in both France and England.

Less controversial, and actually intended for children, is the book Weird Things You Can Grow, published by Random House, and books in the series beginning with Tales Too Funny to be True published by HarperCollins, for which she did the illustrations.

A film version of The Diary of a Teenage Girl premiered at the 2015 Sundance Film Festival. The film was acquired by Sony Pictures Classics at the festival. Adapted and directed by Marielle Heller, it is based on Heller's earlier stage adaptation. The film stars Alexander Skarsgård as Monroe, Kristen Wiig as Charlotte, and Bel Powley as the main character, Minnie Goetze. Heller developed the script at the Sundance Institute's Sundance Feature Film Program Lab. The film won "Best First Feature" at the 2016 Spirit Awards.

Gloeckner briefly taught courses at Suffolk Community College and Stony Brook University.

Gloeckner is an associate professor at the University of Michigan Stamps School of Art & Design, a position she has held since 2010.

In recognition of her contributions to the comic art form, Comics Alliance listed Gloeckner as one of twelve women cartoonists deserving of lifetime achievement recognition.

Personal life 
In 1986, Gloeckner married Czech artist Jakub Kalousek. They later divorced. She has two daughters, Audrey "Fina" Gloeckner-Kalousek and Persephone Gloeckner-Kalousek.

Awards 
 2000: Inkpot Award
 2008: Guggenheim fellowship working on research for a graphic novel about families living in Ciudad Juárez; project inspired by experiences in Ciudad Juarez while researching her story in the 2008 book, I Live Here
 2015-2016: Faculty Fellow in the University of Michigan Institute for the Humanities working on “The Return of Maldoror”

Works and publications

Monographs 
 Gloeckner, Phoebe, and Robert Crumb (introduction). A Child's Life and Other Stories. Berkeley, CA: Frog (imprint of North Atlantic Books), 1998.   Revised edition, 2000.  
 Gloeckner, Phoebe. The Diary of a Teenage Girl: An Account in Words and Pictures. Berkeley, Calif: Frog (imprint of North Atlantic Books), 2002.   Revised edition, 2015.

As contributing author/artist 
 "RE/Search" tabloid zine #2 and #3. San Francisco: RE/Search Publications, 1980–81.
 Kirshner, Mia, Mike Simons, and Paul Shoebridge. "I Live Here." NY: Pantheon Graphic Novels, 2008.

Journals 
 Gloeckner, Phoebe. "Autobiography: The Process Negates the Term." Chaney, Michael A. Graphic Subjects: Critical Essays on Autobiography and Graphic Novels. Madison, Wisconsin: The University of Wisconsin Press, 2011.  
 Gloeckner, Phoebe, Justin Green, Aline Kominsky-Crumb and Carol Tyler. 2014. "Panel: Comics and Autobiography". Critical Inquiry. 40, no. 3: Comics & Media. The University of Chicago Press. Edited by Hillary Chute and Patrick Jagoda: Spring 2014. pp. 86–103.   ]
 Gloeckner, Phoebe. 2014. "Valiente and Arpía". Critical Inquiry. 40, no. 3: Comics & Media. The University of Chicago Press. Edited by Hillary Chute and Patrick Jagoda: Spring 2014. pp. 182–186.   
 Gloeckner, Phoebe. Author Guillermo Paxton: An Interview with "El Guëro de Juárez". 2015.

Children's books 
 Goldenberg, Janet, and Phoebe Gloeckner. Weird Things You Can Grow. New York: Random House, 1994.  
 Goldenberg, Janet, and Phoebe Gloeckner. Weird But True: A Cartoon Encyclopedia of Incredibly Strange Things. New York: HarperTrophy, 1997.  
 Daly-Weir, Catherine, and Phoebe Gloeckner. The Exploding Toilet and Other Tales Too Funny to Be True. New York: HarperCollins, 1998.  
 Busby, Cylin, and Phoebe Gloeckner. The Chicken-Fried Rat: Tales Too Gross to Be True. New York: HarperCollins, 1998.  
 Gilson, Kristin, and Phoebe Gloeckner. The Baby-Sitter's Nightmare: Tales Too Scary to Be True. New York: HarperCollins, 1998.

Illustration work 
 Ballard, J. G. The Atrocity Exhibition. San Francisco, CA: RE/Search Publications, 1990.  
 Juno, Andrea, and V. Vale, editors. Angry Women. San Francisco, CA: RE/Search Publications, 1991. 13.   Revised edition. New York, NY: Juno Books, 1999.  
 Spinrad, Paul. The RE/Search Guide to Bodily Fluids. San Francisco, CA: RE/Search Publications, 1999.  
 Winks, Cathy, Anne Semans, and Cathy Winks. The Good Vibrations Guide to Sex: The Most Complete Sex Manual Ever Written. San Francisco: Cleis Press, 2002.

See also 
 The Diary of a Teenage Girl
 The Diary of a Teenage Girl: An Account in Words and Pictures
 Wimmen's Comix
 Weirdo
 Autobiographical comics

References

Further reading 
 Pekar, Harvey, and Phoebe Gloeckner. Graphic Novels A Conversation : a Panel Discussion with Harvey Pekar and Phoebe Gloeckner. University Park, Pa: Pennsylvania State University, 2007. Recorded on February 22, 2007, at the Foster Auditorium, Pattee Library and Paterno Library, Penn State University. 
 Lealess, Jacqueline. Making a Spectacle The Comics of Debbie Drechsler, Phoebe Gloeckner, Diane DiMassa, and Julie Doucet. Ottawa: Library and Archives Canada = Bibliothèque et Archives Canada, 2007. Thesis/dissertation.  
 Chute, Hillary L. Graphic Women Life Narrative and Contemporary Comics. New York: Columbia University Press, 2010.  
 Michael, Olga, Monica Pearl, and Michael Bibler. Pastiche and Family Strife in Contemporary American Women's Graphic Memoirs: Phoebe Gloeckner, Lynda Barry and Alison Bechdel. University of Manchester, 2014. Thesis/dissertation. 
 Poharec, Lauranne. Showing the Unsayable: Trauma and Juxtaposition in Persepolis and A Child's Life and Other Stories. University of New Mexico. Dept. of Foreign Languages and Literatures, 2014. Thesis/dissertation. 
 Schwartzwald, Robert, Carney, Sean, and Køhlert, Frederik Byrn. Drawing in the Margins: Identity and Subjectivity in Contemporary Autobiographical Comics. Université de Montréal, 2015. Thesis/dissertation.

External links
 Ravenblond official website
 Michigan Daily allegations of racism, transphobia, and sexual assault (June 25, 2022)

1960 births
20th-century American novelists
21st-century American novelists
American women cartoonists
American comics writers
American women novelists
Living people
Medical illustrators
Underground cartoonists
University of Michigan faculty
Female comics writers
American female comics artists
Artists from Philadelphia
20th-century American women writers
21st-century American women writers
Novelists from Michigan
Inkpot Award winners
American cartoonists
American women academics
Castilleja School alumni